is a freelance Japanese voice actress best known for voicing Amy Rose from the Sonic the Hedgehog franchise. While working at a confectionery shop after graduating from Jissen Commercial High School, she attended a voice acting school in the evenings and passed an audition for 81 Produce, where she was later employed until 2010. On October 1, 2019, she announced the formation of a private firm, T-River LLC, and the opening of a private school at the same time.

Filmography

Television animation
1990s
Chibi Maruko-chan (1990) (Toshiko Tsuchihashi)
Sailor Moon R (Momoko Momohara, Mie Sayama)
Battle Athletes (1997) (Ling-Pha Wong)
Dr. Slump (1997) (Arale Norimaki, Mame Soramame)

2000s
Sonic X (2003) (Amy Rose)
Futari wa Pretty Cure Max Heart (2005) (Nozomi)
Futari wa Pretty Cure Splash Star (2006) (Queen Filia)
HeartCatch PreCure! (2010) (Chypre)

2016
JoJo's Bizarre Adventure: Diamond Is Unbreakable (2016) (Invisible Baby/Shizuka Joestar)

Unknown date
Azuki-chan (Kaoru Nishino)
Bomberman B-Daman Bakugaiden V (Megamibon)
Bleach (Miyuki)
Bubu Chacha (Mary)
Cardcaptor Sakura (Yuuki Tachibana)
Casshern Sins (Niko)
Cosmic Baton Girl Comet-san (Rababou)
D.Gray-man (Level 4 Akuma)
D.N.Angel (Mio Hio, Emiko Niwa (younger version))
Futari wa Pretty Cure Splash Star (Queen Filia)
Hamtaro (Yume-chan, Mineko-chan)
Hatara Kizzu Maihamu Gumi (Marina Nikaidō)
Konjiki no Gash Bell!! (Rushka)
A Little Snow Fairy Sugar (Kanon)
One Piece (Milia)
Pita-Ten (Shino)
Pretty Cure All Stars DX2 (Chypre)
Pretty Cure All Stars DX3 (Chypre)
Princess Nine (Nene Mori)
R.O.D the TV (Hisami Hishishii)
Sailor Moon series (Momoko Momohara)
Seraphim Call (Tanpopo Teramoto)
Strange+ (Dorothy)
Sunset on Third Street (Michiko Ohkido (Micchan))
Wolf's Rain (Neige)
Cinnamon the Movie (Cinnamoroll/Cinnamon)

OVA
Here Is Greenwood (????) (Reina Kisaragi)
Ojamajo Doremi Na-i-sho (2004) (Nozomi Waku))
Tales of Phantasia: The Animation (????) (Suzu Fujibayashi)
"Find the Four-Leaf Crimson Clover!" (2003) (Kaede Yoshino)

Video games

Crash Team Racing (Pura)
Mario & Sonic at the London 2012 Olympic Games (Amy Rose)
Mario & Sonic at the Olympic Games (Amy Rose)
Mario & Sonic at the Olympic Games Tokyo 2020 (Amy Rose)
Mario & Sonic at the Olympic Winter Games (Amy Rose)
Mario & Sonic at the Rio 2016 Olympic Games (Amy Rose)
Mario & Sonic at the Sochi 2014 Olympic Winter Games (Amy Rose)
Refrain Love 2 (Akane Misawa)
Shadow the Hedgehog (Amy Rose)
Sonic Advance 3 (Amy Rose)
Sonic Adventure (Amy Rose)
Sonic Adventure 2 (Amy Rose)
Sonic & All-Stars Racing Transformed (Amy Rose)
Sonic the Hedgehog series (Amy Rose)
Sonic and the Black Knight (Amy Rose)
Sonic and the Secret Rings (Amy Rose)
Sonic Battle (Amy Rose)
Sonic Boom: Rise of Lyric (Amy Rose)
Sonic Boom: Shattered Crystal (Amy Rose)
Sonic Colors (Amy Rose)
Sonic Free Riders (Amy Rose)
Sonic Frontiers (Amy Rose)
Sonic Generations (Amy Rose)
Sonic the Hedgehog (2006) (Amy Rose)
Sonic Heroes (Amy Rose)
Sonic Lost World (Amy Rose)
Sonic Riders (Amy Rose)
Sonic Riders: Zero Gravity (Amy Rose)
Sonic Unleashed (Amy Rose)
Tales of Phantasia (Suzu Fujibayashi)
Tales of the World: Radiant Mythology 2 (Suzu Fujibayashi)
Tales of the World: Radiant Mythology 3 (Suzu Fujibayashi)
Tales of Phantasia: Narikiri Dungeon X (Suzu Fujibayashi)
Team Sonic Racing (Amy Rose)
Tokyo Mew Mew (PlayStation game) (Ringo Akai)

Dubbing

Live-action
3 Ninjas: High Noon at Mega Mountain (Michael "Tum Tum" Douglas) (James Paul Roeske II)
Aliens (1992 VHS/DVD edition) (Rebecca "Newt" Jorden) (Carrie Henn)
Annie: A Royal Adventure! (Hannah) (Emily Ann Lloyd)
Babel (Debbie Jones) (Elle Fanning)
Beethoven (Emily Newton) (Sarah Rose Karr)
Beethoven's 2nd (Emily Newton) (Sarah Rose Karr)
Edges of the Lord (Tolo) (Liam Hess)
Enough (Gracie Hiller) (Tessa Allen)
ER (Rachel Greene (Yvonne Zima), Mei-Sun (Lucy Liu))
Full House (Michelle Elizabeth Tanner) (Mary-Kate Olsen, Ashley Olsen))
Hope Floats (Bernice Pruitt (Mae Whitman))
Lemony Snicket's A Series of Unfortunate Events (Sunny Baudelaire)
The Long Kiss Goodnight (Caitlin (Yvonne Zima))
Look Who's Talking Now (Julie Ubriacco (Tabitha Lupien))
My Life Without Me (Patsy (Kenya Jo Kennedy))
Poltergeist film series (Carol Anne Freeling) (Heather O'Rourke)
Resident Evil: Extinction (White Queen (Madeline Carroll))
Sudden Death (1999 TV Asahi edition) (Emily McCord (Whittni Wright))
Two of a Kind (Ashley Burke (Ashley Olsen))
Village of the Damned (1998 TV Asahi edition) (David McGowan (Thomas Dekker))
Waterworld (Enola) (Tina Majorino)

Animation
Babar (TV series) (Flora)
My Little Pony: Equestria Girls (Sweetie Belle)
My Little Pony: Friendship Is Magic (Sweetie Belle)
The Oz Kids (Boris)
The Simpsons (Maggie Simpson) (Elizabeth Taylor)

Other
Kirby and the Story of the Dream Spring (Kirby)
Sanrio character ("Cinnamoroll") (Cinnamoroll/Cinnamon)

References

External links
  
  
 
 

1965 births
Living people
Japanese video game actresses
Sega people
Japanese voice actresses
Voice actresses from Tokyo
20th-century Japanese actresses
21st-century Japanese actresses